Axtaçı Şirvan (also, Akhtachi and Akhtachy Shirvan) is a village and municipality in the Hajigabul Rayon of Azerbaijan.  It has a population of 510.

References 

Populated places in Hajigabul District